Self-Portrait with Dishevelled Hair, also known as Self-Portrait as a Young Man and by various other titles, is an early self-portrait by the Dutch artist Rembrandt. Now in the Rijksmuseum, it dates to 1628 and is an exercise in chiaroscuro. It is one of the earliest of over forty painted self-portraits by Rembrandt, there is a copy in the collection of the National Trust which was created by his workshop.

Notes

External links

Rijksmuseum catalogue entry

Self-portraits by Rembrandt
1628 paintings
Paintings in the collection of the Rijksmuseum